Triantaphyllos the Martyr (ca. 1665 – August 8, 1680) is a martyr and saint of the Greek Orthodox Church. He was born in Zagora, in then Ottoman-controlled Greece, and was taken captive by the Turks one day while he was working as a fisherman. He was tortured when he refused to renounce his Christian faith and convert to Islam and was eventually killed by his captors.

Notes

Bibliography
Παπαδόπουλος, Χρυσόστομος (1922). Οι νεομάρτυρες [The Neomartyrs] (in Greek). Athens.

1662 births
1680 deaths
Greek Orthodox child saints
17th-century Christian saints
Saints of Ottoman Greece
Greek children
Christian saints killed by Muslims
Christians executed for refusing to convert to Islam
Persecution of Christians in the Ottoman Empire
Persecution of Eastern Orthodox Christians
Greek saints of the Eastern Orthodox Church
New Martyrs
People from Zagora, Greece